Kyosuke Matsuyama (松山恭助, Matsuyama Kyōsuke, born 19 December 1996) is a Japanese fencer. He won one of the bronze medals in the men's team foil event at the 2018 Asian Games held in Jakarta, Indonesia.

In 2017, he won the silver medal in the men's individual foil event at the Summer Universiade held in Taipei, Taiwan. He also won the gold medal in the men's team foil event.

References

External links 
 

Living people
1996 births
Place of birth missing (living people)
Japanese male foil fencers
Fencers at the 2018 Asian Games
Medalists at the 2018 Asian Games
Asian Games bronze medalists for Japan
Asian Games medalists in fencing
Universiade medalists in fencing
Universiade gold medalists for Japan
Universiade silver medalists for Japan
Medalists at the 2017 Summer Universiade
Fencers at the 2020 Summer Olympics
Olympic fencers of Japan
Left-handed fencers
20th-century Japanese people
21st-century Japanese people